Inmaculada Cuesta Martínez (born 25 June 1980) is a Spanish actress. She has starred in films such as The Sleeping Voice, Three Many Weddings and The Bride.

Some of her best known television credits include performances in Águila Roja and Arde Madrid.

Early life 
Inmaculada Cuesta Martínez was born in Valencia on 25 June 1980. Born to parents from Andalusia, Cuesta spent her childhood in Arquillos, province of Jaén (Andalusia). Her father was an upholsterer, so she used to collect the leftovers to make handbags and sell them to finance her studies. At age of 18, she moved to Córdoba to study a Degree at the School of Dramatic Art. After completing her studies, she continued her training in Seville. In 2005 she moved to Madrid and entered the Conservatory and School of Dance, a performing arts center run by Carmen Roche.

Career 
Once settled in the capital of Spain, Cuesta undertook her career in the world of the theater from the hand of Nacho Cano starring in the musical Hoy no me puedo levantar. Her first starring role in television was in the series Amar en tiempos revueltos, playing the role of Elisa, a humble girl who became a well-known singer of the time.

After three seasons and almost three years in the musical she signed for another television series, Plan América with Pepe Sancho (TVE 2008).

Very soon she got her first change in the cinema with the 2007 comedy Love Expresso, in which she featured alongside Asier Etxeandía, Alejo Sauras, Diego Paris, Terele Pávez and Elena Ballesteros, among others. Later, she starred together with Fele Martínez and Angel de Andrés the film El kaserón.

In 2009, she began to play the role of Margarita in the series Águila roja which was broadcast by the Spanish public television service TVE.

She shot Águila Roja: la película, the film version of the series, and starred in the film Cousinhood, a comedy by Daniel Sánchez Arévalo, along with Quim Gutiérrez, Raúl Arévalo and Antonio de la Torre. On 21 October 2011 she premiered The Sleeping Voice, a film by Benito Zambrano, co-starring with María León.

At the beginning of 2012, she was a candidate for the Goya Awards as Best Actress thanks to her role in The Sleeping Voice. That year, she also participated in the shooting of the film Unit 7 (Alberto Rodríguez) with Mario Casas and Antonio de la Torre. Also, she played the role of Carmen de Triana in Blancanieves, a silent and black-and-white version of fairy tale Snow White, in which actresses Maribel Verdú, Ángela Molina and Macarena García also participated.

Almost at the same time, she starred in the short film by Rodrigo Atíza, Muchacha con paisaje and participated in Words with Gods (based on Guillermo Arriaga's idea) from the hand of Álex de la Iglesia in a project where directors from all around the world present an episode about religion.

In November 2012, she starred together with Alberto Ammann, Karra Elejalde and Antonio de la Torre on Daniel Calparsoro’s last film, Invader, for which she won the nomination for best supporting actress at the Mestre Mateo Awards.

In 2013 she played Ruth in Javier Ruiz Caldera's story Three Many Weddings, with Martiño Rivas, Paco León, Quim Gutiérrez, Rossy de Palma and Laura Sánchez, among others. She returned to the musicals with Javier Gutiérrez and Marta Ribera with the work ¡Ay, Carmela!. In 2016, along with Argentine actor Ricardo Darín, she performed a young girl from a small villa in Buenos Aires in the film Kóblic by Sebastián Borensztein.

Filmography

Film

Television

Theater

Awards and nominations

Goya Awards

Spanish Actors Union Awards

Premios Feroz

Spanish Academy of Television Awards

References

External links
 

1980 births
Living people
Spanish film actresses
People from Valencia
21st-century Spanish actresses
Actresses from Andalusia
Spanish television actresses